Loek Aloysius Jacobus Maria Ursem (born 7 January 1958) is a retired Dutch footballer who played in the Football League for Sunderland and Stoke City. He made 40 appearances for Stoke.

Career
Ursem became the first foreign player to play for Stoke City, having been brought to the club by Alan Durban from AZ '67. He spent four years at the Victoria Ground making just under 50 appearances for the club. He became a popular player with the Stoke supporters in the 1980–81 season. When Durban left to join Sunderland in 1981 Ursem followed him to Roker Park on loan and played four matches for the 'Black Cats'. He returned to the Netherlands in 1982 with FC Haarlem.

Personal life
Ursem runs his own TV repair shop in Purmerend.

Career statistics
Source:

References

1958 births
Living people
Dutch footballers
AZ Alkmaar players
Stoke City F.C. players
Sunderland A.F.C. players
HFC Haarlem players
FC Wageningen players
English Football League players
Footballers from Amsterdam
Association football midfielders